Monessen City School District is a tiny, urban, public school district operating in southwestern Westmoreland County, Pennsylvania. It serves the city of Monessen, Pennsylvania. According to 2000 federal census data, it serves a resident population of 8,670. In 2010, the population of the District had decline to 7,717 people. In 2009, the District residents’ per capita income was $16,627, while the median family income was $37,269. In the Commonwealth, the median family income was $49,501 and the United States median family income was $49,445, in 2010. By 2013, the median household income in the United States rose to $52,100.

School District of the City of Monessen operates three schools: Monessen Elementary Center (K–5), Monessen City High School (6–12). The middle school and high school share a single building. The District uses the Westmoreland Intermediate Unit No. 7 for services to special education students and faculty training.

Extracurriculars
The District offers a wide variety of clubs, activities and an extensive sports program.

Sports
The District funds:

Varsity

Boys
Baseball – A
Basketball – A Varsity and JV teams
Football – A Varsity & JV
Soccer – A Varsity & JV
Track and Field – AA

Girls
Basketball – A Varsity & JV
Cheerleading Varsity & JV
Soccer (Fall) – A Varsity & JV
Softball – A
Track and Field – AA

Middle School Sports

Boys
Basketball
Football
Soccer

Girls
Basketball
Soccer (Fall)
Softball 

According to PIAA directory July 2013

References

School districts in Westmoreland County, Pennsylvania